The participation of Tunisia in the ABU TV Song Festival has occurred once since the inaugural ABU TV Song Festival began in 2012. Since their début in 2016, the Tunisian entry has been organised by the broadcaster Arab States Broadcasting Union (ASBU) through their national TV broadcaster Télévision Tunisienne. In 2017, Tunisia withdrew from the festival.

Participation overview 

 Entry intended, but later withdrew.

References 

Countries at the ABU Song Festival